Gonzalo Castillo may refer to:

 Gonzalo Castillo (politician) (born 1960), Dominican politician
 Gonzalo Castillo (footballer) (born 1990), Uruguayan footballer

Castillo, Gonzalo